Jovan Najdanović (born 20 January 1997) is a Serbian football goalkeeper.

Club career

Radnički Kragujevac
Born in Kragujevac, Jovan started his youth career with local club Šumadija 1903, and later he moved to Radnički Kragujevac where he completed youth categories. Najdanović joined the first team of Radnički Kragujevac ending of 2014–15 season under coach Neško Milovanović after Miloš Vesić left the club and Žarko Trifunović missed some matches because of the yellow card accumulation. He was sitting on the bench as a reserve goalkeeper with number 97 jersey in 29 fixture match of the Serbian SuperLiga, against Jagodina. After Radnički relegated to the Serbian First League, Najdanović started the 2015–16 season as a reserve goalkeeper. He made his senior debut for the club in the 2nd fixture match against Sloga Petrovac na Mlavi after Marko Kostić got the red card. He also saved one penalty kick in a cup match against Bežanija, played on 28 October 2015. For the first fully pro season with the club, Najdanović collected 10 appearances, including 9 league and 1 cup match. During the first half of the 2016–17 season, Najdanović was loaned to Morava Zone League side Sušica. For the rest of season, he was mostly used as a back-up choice. In summer 2017, after he started the 2017–18 season as a back-up choice, Najdanović moved on six-month loan to Zlatibor Čajetina.

Career statistics

Honours
Radnički Kragujevac
Serbian League West: 2016–17

References

External links
 Jovan Najdanović  at serbiacorner.com
 

1997 births
Living people
Sportspeople from Kragujevac
Association football goalkeepers
Serbian footballers
FK Radnički 1923 players
FK Zlatibor Čajetina players
Serbian First League players